The Carranza Lighthouse, also known as Lighthouse Cabo Carranza, is an active 19th century  Chilean lighthouse situated in the Maule Region. It is part of the network of lighthouses in Chile.

History 
This lighthouse was inaugurated on September 1, 1895 in the vicinity of Caleta Loanco. It has the peculiarity of being the only Chilean lighthouse with metallic pyramidal tower and a rectangular base.

Construction of the light was motivated by shipwrecks in the vicinities to the Punta Santa Ana, the most well known being that of the Cazador on January 30, 1856. Also, in the vicinity is  the wreck of the SS John Elder, that was lost on January 17, 1892 during a cruise between Valparaíso and Talcahuano. Although carrying 132 people, there were no human losses.

At present it houses personnel of the Chilean Navy, as well as serving as an aid to navigation, since 1979 it has also been used as a meteorological station.

See also

 Lighthouses in Chile
 List of lighthouses in Chile

References 

Lighthouses in Chile